Thanks of a Grateful Nation is a 1998 original miniseries about the Gulf War. Directed by Rod Holcomb, it stars Ted Danson, Jennifer Jason Leigh, and Brian Dennehy.

Cast
 Ted Danson as Jim Tuite
 Jennifer Jason Leigh as Teri Small
 Brian Dennehy as Senator Donald Riegle
 Marg Helgenberger as Jerrilyn Folz
 Steven Weber as Jared Gallimore
 Matt Keeslar as Chris Small
 Robin Gammell as Clark Nugent
 Sabrina Grdevich as Sandra
 C. David Johnson as Steve Robertson
 Cynthia Dale as Lisa Tuite
 Amy Carlson as Tammy Boyer
 Kenneth Welsh as Senator Shelby
 Booth Savage as Gary Wall
 Bruce Gray as Senator Rockefeller
 Michael Rhoades as Sergeant George Grass
 Jonathan Whittaker as Representative Steve Buyer
 Hrant Alinak as Dr. Sid Beria
 Liisa Repo-Martell as Kristie Schuermann 
 Steve Mousseau as Sterling Sims
 Susan Coyne as Ammie West
 Martha Burns as Dr. Rosemary Dove
 Lynne Deragon as Mrs. Gallimore
 Garnet Harding as Jimmy
 Richard Chevolleau as Tater
 Tony Munch as Ned Brisby
 Janet Kidder as Rosca
 Gina Clayton as Dr. Applebaum
 Robert Bockstael as Dr. Lavigello
 Nicholas Campbell as Representative Joseph P. Kennedy II
 Richard Fitzpatrick as Dr. Egilson
 Scott Gibson as Tray Haworth
 Karyn Dwyer as Deeni
 Hardee T. Lineham as Major Thomas Cross
 Doug Lennox as Jack Whiting
 Gerard Parkes as Ferdinand Noble
 Marcia Bennett as Dr. Joyce Lasnot
 J. Patrick McCormack as Bert Tardino
 Nigel Bennett as Colonel Sanitsky
 Ken James as Dr. Evan Johns
 Christina Collins as Jan Sparks
 John Nelles as Dr. Fritz Roddam
 Tyrone Benskin as Supervisor Meeker
 Michael Dyson as Stewy Galardi
 Robert Bidaman as Dr. Donald Curtis
 Norma Dell'Agnese as Vanna
 William Colgate as Dr. Seawell
 Patrick Chilvers as Keith Ruckhauser
 Sharon Bernbaum as Dr. Nashal
 Greg Ellwood as Dr. Tobias Azian
 Ralph Small as Major Rongjaw
 Lynne Cormack as Diedre Tama
 Alan Murley as General Stalls
 John Mark Robinson as Sergeant Elvis Jones
 Carolyn Dunn as Sally Goodnight
 Victoria Snow as Marcia Timmerman
 David Crean as James Holsinger
 Carol Anderson as Dr. Susan Mather
 Dan Lett as Dr. Lucifer
 Richard Blackburn as Senator Bennett
 Jan Filips as Congressman
 Andrew Miller as Jeff Bradford
 John Innes as Pastor
 Barry Flatman as Lieutenant Colonel Nalls
 Matthew Bennett as Dr. Larson
 Mung-Ling Tsui as Dr. Nishimi
 John Dibben as Dr. Caplan
 James Downing as David Folz
 Jean Daigle as Jon Querry
 Amanda Farrace as Kourtney Foir
 Jonathan Higgins as George Littell
 Panou as Kim
 William Pappas as Representative Sonny Montgomery
 Kinnery Thompson as Alexandra Small

Awards

References

External links
 
 

1990s American television miniseries
1998 in American television
1998 television films
1998 films
Films directed by Rod Holcomb
1990s English-language films